Men's Hall, also known as Boreman Hall South, is a historic dormitory associated with the West Virginia University and located at Morgantown, Monongalia County, West Virginia. It was built in 1935, and is a five-story, "E"-shaped red brick building with Classical Revival detailing. It sits on a reinforced concrete foundation and has a slate covered gable roof.  When documented in 1989, it housed 350 students in 329 rooms.  It was the first dormitory built for men on campus. Its construction was funded in part by the Works Progress Administration.  During World War II, it was used as an Air Force barracks.

It was listed on the National Register of Historic Places in 1989.

References

See also
 National Register of Historic Places listings at colleges and universities in the United States

Residential buildings completed in 1935
Neoclassical architecture in West Virginia
Residential buildings on the National Register of Historic Places in West Virginia
West Virginia University campus
Works Progress Administration in West Virginia
University and college buildings on the National Register of Historic Places in West Virginia
National Register of Historic Places in Monongalia County, West Virginia